The second series of Je suis une célébrité, sortez-moi de là !, the French version of I'm a Celebrity...Get Me Out of Here!, premiered on 9 July 2019.

This season was be different from the first, as the mode of elimination was no longer entrusted to the public. The show was won by Gérard Vivès.

Celebrities
The program began with 11 celebrity contestants.

Results and elimination
 Indicates that the celebrity was in the bottom
 Indicates that the celebrity was safe from elimination
 Indicates the winner celebrity
 Indicates the runner-up celebrity
 Indicates that the celebrity received the fewest votes
 Indicates that the celebrity was eliminated
 Indicates that the celebrity withdrew

References

External links

2019 French television seasons
France